Deiton Baughman (born April 23, 1996) is an American tennis player.

Baughman has a career high ATP singles ranking of 341 achieved on October 26, 2015. He also has a career high ATP doubles ranking of 354 achieved on October 26, 2015.

Baughman made his ATP main draw debut at the 2014 Sony Open Tennis in the doubles event partnering Martin Redlicki. The pair were given a wildcard and lost in the first round to Ryan Harrison and Jack Sock.

At the 2015 US Open, Baughman made his grand slam main draw debut in the doubles event, where he was given a wildcard with Tommy Paul.

Baughman is known for his creative, "stream-of-consciousness" outbursts during matches.

References

External links
 
 

1996 births
Living people
American male tennis players